Baltic Legions refers to the three Baltic Waffen SS divisions:

 20th Waffen Grenadier Division of the SS (1st Estonian)
 15th Waffen Grenadier Division of the SS (1st Latvian)
 19th Waffen Grenadier Division of the SS (2nd Latvian)

Military units and formations disambiguation pages